Pleasant Hill is a neighbourhood of Saskatoon, Saskatchewan, Canada. The Governments are undertaking a major re-vitalization project of Pleasant Hill.  $3.5 million is being invested in the business, and residential areas as well as in St. Mary's School. Together the Saskatoon Urban Renewal Project, the provincial government and the Western Economic Diversification project of the federal Government will result in neighbourhood overhauls. 29 lots zoned for business along 20th Street will be levelled and modern commercial upgrades put into place. Selected lots along Avenue N and Avenue O zoned as residential will be demolished to make way for affordable and decent homes. St. Mary's School will receive major renovations or replacement, possibly even a new community centre.

Layout
Within the Core Neighbourhoods Suburban Development Area (West Side), the neighbourhood of Pleasant Hill is triangular in shape and is south of 23rd Street, North-west of the rail line which runs diagonally and east of Avenue W South. Streets are laid out east and west, avenues are laid out running north and south. The whole of the Pleasant Hill community is laid out in a grid pattern.

History

The first name of the hill of this area was called Willoughby Hill.

From 1884 to 1890, Dr. J.H.C. Wiloughby was Saskatoon's first post master and first physician on the east side of the River until after providing medical assistance to Middleton's troops during the Riel Rebellion (Revolution). From 1885 to 1900 he departed to Regina. John Henry C. returned with his wife (Miss Hilliard) and homesteaded at Willoughby Hill. His homestead was Section 30 Township 36 Range 5 West of the 3rd Meridian, and his home was located at the present location of St. Paul's Hospital. Being that he was a physician, his home was one of the first hospitals of the City of Saskatoon. In 1903 he helped to establish the first telephone in the area. He also became one of Saskatoon's first city councillors from 1907–1908.

The boundaries of the Pleasant Hill community used to extend west of Avenue W to Circle Drive, but in the early 1990s the City of Saskatoon redrew many of its neighbourhood boundaries; as a result, the section west of Avenue W was renamed Meadowgreen.

Demographics

There are 4,415 people living in the Pleasant Hill community area. The majority of homes in the Pleasant Hill Community are Multi Unit Dwellings. This area was first settled at the turn of the 20th century, age of homes are generally built before 1908 and typically sell between $58,995 and $68,269. Pleasant Hill has been a Vibrant Communities Partner since 2001 and benefits from various community developments by Quint Development Corporation and Children's Hunger and Education Project. In Pleasant Hill in 2006, the average household size was 2.2 and the homeownership was 25.5%. According to MLS data, the average sale price of a home as of 2013 was $186,367.

Government and politics
Pleasant Hill exists within the federal electoral district of Saskatoon West. It is currently represented by Brad Redekopp of the Conservative Party of Canada, first elected in 2019.

Provincially, the area is divided by 20th Street into two constituencies. The southern portion lies within the constituency of Saskatoon Riversdale. It is currently represented by Danielle Chartier of the Saskatchewan New Democratic Party (NDP), first elected in a 2009 by-election. The northern portion lies within the constituency of Saskatoon Centre. It is currently represented by David Forbes of the NDP, first elected in a 2001 by-election.

In Saskatoon's non-partisan municipal politics, Pleasant Hill lies within ward 2. It is currently represented by Hilary Gough, first elected in 2016.

Features

Protected properties

 Ukrainian Catholic Cathedral of St. George located at 222 Avenue M South and built by architect the Very Reverend Philip Ruh, O.M.I. in 1923

Potential heritage properties
 Nurses Residence, St. Paul's Hospital
 Pleasant Hill School
 The Bosnia Club

Education

Pleasant Hill School - public elementary, part of the Saskatoon Public School Division
St. Mary's Wellness and Education Centre - separate (Catholic) elementary, part of Greater Saskatoon Catholic Schools

Public services
Saskatoon Light and Power provides electrical utilities to all Saskatoon neighbourhoods which existed prior to 1958.  Water is treated and supplied by the City of Saskatoon Water and Wastewater Treatment Branch. St. Paul's Hospital is located in Pleasant Hill, Royal University Hospital is located in the University of Saskatchewan Land Management area, and Saskatoon City Hospital is located in City Park. The Saskatoon Police Service Headquarters location is within the Central Business District located at 130 4th Avenue North. The Central Division oversees the Central Business District, the Riversdale Business District, SIAST and nine other residential areas.  Pleasant Hill is served by the City of Saskatoon Saskatoon Fire & Protective Services, Fire Hall number 1 and head office is located at 125 Idylwyld Drive South, Riversdale.

Parks and recreation

 D.L. Hamilton Park – 
 Fred Mendel Park – 
 Pleasant Hill Rec. Unit – 
 St. George's Park – 
 Grace Adam Metawewinihk Park – 
 Pleasant Hill Spray Paddling Pool

Area religion

 Saskatoon Dawah Center
 St. Mary's Church
 St.George's Church and St. George's Hall.

Transportation

City transit
Pleasant Hill is serviced by the Saskatoon Transit bus routes #1, #2, #50 and #60. Route #5 also runs along Rusholme Road, a block north of the neighbourhood boundary.

22nd Street (Highway 14) is a major thoroughfare through Saskatoon.  Highway 7 has its junction at (Highway 14.  Highway 14 connects with Asquith, Biggar Wilkie, Unity, and Macklin en route to Alberta.

Life

Pleasant Hill Community Association provides leisure activities for various age groups and operates out of both Pleasant Hill School and St. Mary School.

Saskatchewan Music Educators has introduced drum circles entitled Circles of Peace in various schools, of which the Pleasant Hill Community School is one.

References

External links

 Local Area Planning
 City of Saskatoon · Departments · Community Services · Community
 Pleasant Hill Local Area Plan
 Saskatoon Neighbourhoods Word Search Puzzle
 City of Saskatoon · Departments · Community Services · Community ... 
 City of Saskatoon · Departments · Community Services · City Planning · ZAM Maps
 Populace Spring 2006

Neighbourhoods in Saskatoon
Urban renewal